Jenkins' Town Lyceum Building, also known as Jenkintown Library, is a historic lyceum and library building located at Jenkintown, Montgomery County, Pennsylvania. The original building was built in 1839, and expanded in 1909–1910.  It is a two-story, fieldstone building with a gable roof and a one-story rear wing and addition.  It features a two-story, columned portico with a flagstone floor.  The Reading Room and Lambert Memorial Room have notable decorations.

It was added to the National Register of Historic Places in 1979.

References

Library buildings completed in 1839
Library buildings completed in 1910
Jenkintown, Pennsylvania
Libraries on the National Register of Historic Places in Pennsylvania
Buildings and structures in Montgomery County, Pennsylvania
National Register of Historic Places in Montgomery County, Pennsylvania